Staff Group was a type of unit of the United States Marine Corps Reserve.  These units trained Marine officers to serve on a division or general staff. They existed from about 1955 to 1980.

Units
1st Staff Group (Ground), Navy and Marine Corps Reserve Training Center, Brooklyn, New York
3rd Staff Group
4th Staff Group, Philadelphia, Pennsylvania
5th Staff Group, Washington, DC
6th Staff Group, Atlanta, Georgia
7th Staff Group, Richmond, Virginia / St. Louis, Missouri
8th Staff Group, Houston, Texas
9th Staff Group, Forest Park, Illinois
13th Staff Group, Detroit, Michigan
16th Staff Group (Ground), San Diego, California

Notes

Military units and formations of the United States Marine Corps Reserve